Sun Rui is a Chinese  football player. She was part of the Chinese team at the 2003 FIFA Women's World Cup.

References

1978 births
Living people
Chinese women's footballers
2003 FIFA Women's World Cup players
China women's international footballers
Women's association football defenders
Asian Games medalists in football
Footballers at the 2002 Asian Games
Asian Games silver medalists for China
Medalists at the 2002 Asian Games